Shēnjǐng (深井) may refer to:

 Shenjing, Taishan, town in Guangdong, China
 Shenjing, Xuanhua County, town in Hebei, China